Erlbach-Kirchberg is a former municipality in the district Erzgebirgskreis, in Saxony, Germany. Since 1 January 2013, it is part of the town Lugau.

History 
Erlbach was established as a waldhufendorf settlement by Frankish farmers in the 12th century. The first documented mention of the place was in 1486.

Monuments 
A monument was erected in Erlbach graveyard in memorial of six unknown concentration camp prisoners who were murdered in the vicinity in March 1945 by SS soldiers on a death march from Auschwitz.

Gallery

External links 

 Offizielle Website der Gemeinde
 Website der Kirchgemeinden Erlbach-Kirchberg, Leukersdorf und Ursprung

References 

Former municipalities in Saxony